Bellary Assembly seat is one of the 224 seats in Karnataka State Assembly in India. It is part of Bellary Lok Sabha seat. The constituency is reserved for Scheduled Tribes after delimitation in 2008. It is a stronghold of B Sriramulu. It consists of 11 wards of Bellary City. The areas Cowl Bazar, TB Sanatorium, and Contonment belong to this constituency. It has both urban and rural votes.

Geographical scope
The constituency comprises ward nos. 4, 25, 26, 27, 28, 29, 31, 32, 33, 34, 35 of Ballari Municipal Corporation lying in Ballari taluka. 
Urban voters in Bellary (ST) assembly were 85,124 which was 38% in the 2011 census; rural voters were 138,887 which was around 62%.

Members of Legislative Assembly

Election results

2018

1967 Assembly Election
 V. Nagappa (Swatantra) : 27,052 votes    
 T. G. Sathyanarayan (INC) : 11,963 votes

2018 Assembly Election
 B Nagendra (INC) : 79,186 votes  
 Sanna Pakirappa (BJP) : 76,507 votes

See also 
 List of constituencies of Karnataka Legislative Assembly

References 

Assembly constituencies of Karnataka